Xenia is an extinct community in Nodaway County, Missouri, in the United States. The exact location of Xenia is unknown to the GNIS.

A post office called Xenia was established in 1857, and remained in operation until 1872. The name is a transfer from Xenia, Ohio. Little remains of the original community.

References

Ghost towns in Missouri
Former populated places in Nodaway County, Missouri
1857 establishments in Missouri